This is a list of players who played at least one game for the Vancouver Blazers (1973–74 to 1974–75) of the World Hockey Association (WHA).



A
Jim Adair,
Yves Archambault,

B
Andy Bathgate,
Serge Beaudoin,
Michel Boudreau,
Arnie Brown,
Don Burgess,

C
Bryan Campbell,
Colin Campbell,
Rychard Campeau,
Jim Cardiff,
Mike Chernoff,
Ron Chipperfield,

D
Butch Deadmarsh,
Ray Delorenzi,
Pete Donnelly,
Peter Driscoll,

G
George Gardner,
Sam Gellard,
Dave Given,
Bud Gulka,

H
Hugh Harris,
Ed Hatoum,
Dave Hutchison,

I
Larry Israelson,

J
Rick Jodzio,
Jimmy Jones,

L
Camille LaPierre,
Danny Lawson,

M
Ralph MacSweyn,
Don McCulloch,
John McKenzie,
Don McLeod,
Peter McNamee,
Denis Meloche,
John Migneault,
Murray Myers,

O
Don O'Donoghue,

P
Mike Pelyk,
Michel Plante,
Ron Plumb,
Pat Price,

R
Duane Rupp,

S
John Shmyr,
Irv Spencer,
Claude St. Sauveur,
Danny Sullivan,

T
Paul Terbenche,
Jean Tetreault,

W
Rob Walton,
Ron Ward,
Wayne Wood,

References
Vancouver Blazers all-time player roster at hockeydb.com

Vancouver Blazers